Gonzalo Santonja Gómez-Agero (born 12 October 1952) is a Spanish writer and professor. In 2022, he was named Minister of Culture in the Junta of Castile and León.

Biography
Born in Béjar, Province of Salamanca, Santonja was active in the Communist Party of Spain (PCE) in his youth, for which he was arrested in the late years of Francoist Spain. He fled to France but moved back soon after, stating that he could not stand the French people. In the 1970s, he also expressed sympathy for Herri Batasuna, the political arm of ETA. He was a close friend of communist poet Rafael Alberti and an advisor to his eponymous foundation. He married Dolores Grimau, whose father Julián Grimau was executed by Franco in 1963 for running the PCE's clandestine activities in Spain.

He is a member of the Academia Argentina de Letras, the North American Academy of the Spanish Language and the Philippine Academy of the Spanish Language. He has written over 30 books of essays  and five on the history of bullfighting, a practice that he supports. He has been a professor at the Complutense University of Madrid and director of the Instituto Castellano y Leonés de la Lengua.

In March 2022, he was named Minister of Culture in the Junta of Castile and León, being named by Vox, the junior partner in the Second government of Alfonso Fernández Mañueco.

References

1952 births
Living people
People from Béjar
Academic staff of the Complutense University of Madrid
Government ministers of Castile and León